Asseco Resovia Rzeszów 2016–2017 season is the 2016/2017 volleyball season for Polish professional volleyball club Asseco Resovia Rzeszów.

The club competes in:
 Polish Championship
 Polish Cup
 CEV Champions League

Team Roster Season 2016-2017
Head coach: Andrzej Kowal

1 According to notation in contract, Jaeschke will back to Asseco Resovia team in January 2017, when he will graduate his university.

Players of Asseco Resovia Rzeszów on loan:

Squad changes for the 2016–2017 season
In:

Out:

Most Valuable Players

Results, schedules and standings

2016–17 PlusLiga

Regular season

Semifinal

3rd place

Final

2016–17 CEV Champions League

Pool B

Playoff 12

References

Resovia (volleyball) seasons